Giuseppe Rovani (12 January 1818–26 January 1874) was an Italian novelist and essayist.

Rovani was born in Milan. He was known for criticism of historical novels of the Romantic style, which were popular in Italy at the time and whose stereotypes and old fashioned plots he pointed out. He wrote Lamberto Malatesta (1843), Valenzia Candiano (1843) and Manfredo Pallavicino (1845-1846). He took part in the Italian Risorgimento and was a forerunner of the Milanese Scapigliatura.

In 1859 he was part of a consortium of writers who co-edited the newspaper Gazzetta di Milano.

His masterwork is the novel Cento Anni (1859-1864) which, together with Ippolito Nievo's Confessioni di un italiano, had an important impact on the evolution of Italian literature.

Rovani died in Milan in 1874. His body was embalmed by Paolo Gorini and was buried in the Cimitero Monumentale di Milano.

References

External links
 
 

1818 births
1874 deaths
Writers from Milan
Italian newspaper editors
Italian male journalists
Italian male writers
Scapigliatura Movement